The Weymouth Lowlands form a natural region on the south coast of England in the county of Dorset. Much of the area lies with the Dorset Area of Outstanding Natural Beauty.

According to Natural England, who have designated the Weymouth Lowlands as National Character Area 138, they cover an area of 13,251 hectares; a coastal strip between about 1 and 6 kilometres wide, running from the Bride Valley, west of Burton Bradstock, to east of Osmington and including the town of Weymouth, the main settlement of the area. A steep ridge of chalk marks the start of the Dorset Downs to the north; to the south is the Isle of Portland and to the east is the Isle of Purbeck

The coastline of the Weymouth Lowlands is dominated by Chesil Beach, which hugs the littoral grasslands in the west before separating from the mainland in the east to form The Fleet, a series of brackish lagoons, and then continuing as a narrow causeway linking the mainland with the Isle of Portland. In the hinterland there are long, rounded, often bare, hogsback ridges interspersed with broad, clay vales. Arable farming predominates. Apart from the town of Weymouth, settlement is sparse and the few villages are small and compact. In the west the landscape is more varied, wooded and undulating than the eastern part of the Lowlands.

References 

Natural regions of Dorset
Natural regions of England